Local elections were held in Biñan City on May 13, 2019, during the Philippine general election. The voters elected for the elective local posts in the city: the representative, mayor, vice mayor, the two provincial board members for Laguna, and twelve councilors.

Candidates

Representative

Mayor

Vice Mayor

Councilors

|-bgcolor=black
|colspan=8|

References

2019 Philippine local elections
Elections in Laguna (province)
Biñan
Elections in Biñan